Gary Cohen (born 1958) is an American sportscaster.

Gary Cohen may also refer to:

Gary Cohen (footballer) (born 1984), English cyclist and former footballer
Gary G. Cohen (born 1934), American theologian
Gary Cohen (health advocate), American environmental activist and health advocate
 Gary B. Cohen (born 1948), American historian.

See also
Gary Cohn (disambiguation)